Gerard Newcombe, born in Sydney, Australia on 3 December 1953, is the Managing Director of All Asia Investments, a trading and investment company which has been operating in the Asia Pacific Region for over 40 years. His previous writing accomplishments have been in business  and trade news coverage, and as a travel writer.

Gerard currently lives in Sydney, Australia with his wife and son, and has a rural property in North Eastern Thailand where he escapes with the family to relax and follow his other passion writing.

Books published
Marketing: The Simple Technique
Surviving Asia: A Survival Summary Guide
Old Asia Hand: Asia Pacific Adventures

References

External links
 Australian Authors website
 Books Published by Gerard Newcombe  website
 Books published by Gerard Newcombe available on Amazon  website
 Books published by Gerard Newcombe available on Google Books  website

1953 births
Living people
Australian businesspeople
Australian writers